My Life as a Courgette (also titled My Life as a Zucchini in North America and Australia) is a 2016 stop-motion animated comedy-drama film directed by Claude Barras, and co-written by Céline Sciamma. It was screened in the Directors' Fortnight section at the 2016 Cannes Film Festival.

This is the second adaptation of Gilles Paris' 2002 novel Autobiographie d'une Courgette, as there was a French live-action television film adaptation called C'est mieux la vie quand on est grand which aired in 2007.

The film received extremely positive reception from critics, with many praising the film's visual aesthetic, emotional depth, and sympathetic characters. It won Best Animated Film and Best Adapted Screenplay at the 42nd César Awards. At the 89th Academy Awards, it was nominated for the Best Animated Feature Film and was selected as the Swiss entry for the Best Foreign Language Film at the 89th Academy Awards, making the December shortlist.

Plot
Set in Switzerland in the 2010s, Icare lives with his mother who has become an alcoholic after Icare's father abandoned their family. One day when his mom comes after him in a drunken rage, Icare accidentally pushes her down the stairs, causing her death. Later on, Icare makes a deposition to Police Officer Raymond. He informs him that he prefers to be called "Courgette", his mother's nickname for him. As mementos, he keeps one of his mom's beer cans and a kite he made with a drawing of his father as a superhero.

Raymond brings Courgette to an orphanage. Simon, one of the kids there, initially picks on Courgette and tries to force him to say what happened to his parents. After a fight over the kite, Simon warms up to Courgette and explains that he's the one who knows about all the kids' backgrounds. He then points out the backstories of the other kids, whose parents are either deceased or, as in Simon's case, in trouble with the law. Courgette then tells him about what happened to his own mother.

One day, a new girl named Camille arrives and Courgette develops a crush on her at first sight. Simon and Courgette sneak a look at her files and find that she had witnessed her father murder her mother for cheating on him, and then kill himself. Camille does have a living aunt, but she is a spiteful woman who wants custody of Camille only for the money she'll get in taking her in. Courgette and Camille start to bond during an overnight vacation at a snow resort, where he refashions his mom's beer can into a toy boat for her.

Courgette grows close to Officer Raymond as he regularly sends letters and drawings to him. Raymond plans to spend a holiday with Courgette, on the same weekend that Camille is supposed to spend with her aunt. Camille stows away in Raymond's car instead. Raymond reluctantly agrees to bring both kids to the outing. The three have fun at an amusement park and return to Raymond's house, where Raymond reveals that he has a son that never talks to him. Camille's aunt suddenly appears and angrily takes Camille away.

A few weeks later comes the custody meeting with the judge. There, Camille reveals that Simon had snuck an MP3 player into her toy boat that she's used to record her aunt insulting her mom and yelling at her. The aunt loses her temper at Camille right in front of the judge, destroying her bid for custody.

Raymond finally decides to take both Courgette and Camille in as foster children. Simon is initially angry, but he ultimately coaxes a reluctant Courgette to go with Raymond. Raymond takes some group photos of the kids before he leaves with Courgette and Camille. While living with Raymond, Courgette still writes letters to the kids at the orphanage, maintaining that he, Camille and Raymond are people that still love them all. Courgette now keeps a group photo of the kids on his kite.

Cast

Reception

Critical response
The film has a rating of 99% on Rotten Tomatoes, based on 137 reviews, with an average rating of 8.20/10. The site's critical consensus reads, "My Life as a Zucchinis silly title and adorable characters belie a sober story whose colorful visuals delight the senses even as it braves dark emotional depths." On Metacritic, the film received a rating of 85 out of 100, based on 28 critics, indicating "universal acclaim".

Accolades

See also
 List of submissions to the 89th Academy Awards for Best Foreign Language Film
 List of Swiss submissions for the Academy Award for Best Foreign Language Film

Notes

References

External links

 GKIDS official site
 
 
 
 
 

2016 films
2016 animated films
2016 comedy-drama films
2016 directorial debut films
2016 independent films
2010s French animated films
2010s stop-motion animated films
Anifilm award winners
Animated comedy films
Animated drama films
Animated films about orphans
Animated films based on novels
Annecy Cristal for a Feature Film winners
Films based on French novels
French comedy-drama films
Films about orphans
French independent films
2010s French-language films
Swiss animated films
Swiss comedy-drama films
Swiss independent films
Films set in Switzerland
Films about dysfunctional families
French-language Swiss films
French adult animated films